Baalbek District is an administrative district in the Baalbek-Hermel Governorate of the Republic of Lebanon, having the city Baalbek as its capital.

Major towns of the district are Hallanieh, Temnin el Fawka, Chmestar, Duris, Jdeide, Kasarnaba and Bodai

 
Districts of Lebanon